Those Who Love Me Can Take the Train is a 1998 French drama film directed by Patrice Chéreau and 
written by Chéreau, Danièle Thompson and Pierre Trividic. It stars Pascal Greggory, Vincent Perez, Charles Berling and Dominique Blanc.

Plot
The film follows the friends of a recently deceased minor painter Jean-Baptiste Emmerich as they take a train from Paris to Limoges, where he is to be buried, attend his funeral, then gather at the home of his twin brother, Lucien. The mourners include François, who spends the journey listening to a series of taped conversations with the painter; Jean-Marie and Claire, a couple whose marriage has broken down; Emmerich's former lover Lucie;  Louis, a close friend of François, and Bruno a young man with whom he has fallen in love. As the train heads south, the travellers watch the car carrying Emmerich's coffin being driven recklessly alongside the train by their friend Thierry.

At the funeral Jean-Marie makes a speech condemning  family life, and declares, to Claire's anger, that he will never become a father. Claire discovers that a young woman present, Viviane, was actually Emmerich's son Frédéric, who has become a woman.

Background and filming
The inspiration for the film, and its title, came from a request made by the documentary film-maker François Reichenbach to those attending his funeral.

The sequences on the train were filmed over 14 days in two carriages on trains running between Paris and Mulhouse. Interviewed in The Guardian, Patrice Chereau said "You cannot really fabricate the movement of a train in a studio - the actors and the camera moving at the same time. We needed to have the real energy of that journey". Reviewing the film for Sight & Sound, Chris Darke said "the journey to Limoges is a triumph both of exposition and choreography.....Éric Gautier's use of handheld 'Scope cinematography gives the feeling of both buffeting movement and swooping detail."

Cast
Pascal Greggory as François
Valeria Bruni Tedeschi as Claire (as Valeria Bruni-Tedeschi)
Charles Berling as Jean-Marie
Jean-Louis Trintignant – Lucien Emmerich / Jean-Baptiste Emmerich
Bruno Todeschini as Louis
Sylvain Jacques as Bruno
Vincent Perez as Viviane
Roschdy Zem as Thierry
Dominique Blanc as Catherine
Delphine Schiltz as Elodie
Nathan Kogen as Sami (as Nathan Cogan)
Marie Daëms as Lucie
Chantal Neuwirth as Geneviève
Thierry de Peretti as Dominique
Olivier Gourmet as Bernard

Awards and nominations
British Independent Film Awards (UK)
Nominated: Best Foreign Language Film
1998 Cannes Film Festival (France)
Nominated: Golden Palm (Patrice Chéreau)
24th César Awards (France)
Won: Best Actress – Supporting Role (Dominique Blanc)
Won: Best Cinematography (Eric Gautier)
Won: Best Director (Patrice Chéreau)
Nominated: Best Actor – Leading Role (Pascal Greggory)
Nominated: Best Actor – Supporting Role (Vincent Perez)
Nominated: Best Actor – Supporting Role (Jean-Louis Trintignant)
Nominated: Best Editing (François Gédigier)
Nominated: Best Film 
Nominated: Best Production Design (Sylvain Chauvelot and Richard Peduzzi)
Nominated: Best Sound (Guillaume Sciama and Jean-Pierre Laforce)
Nominated: Best Writing (Patrice Chéreau, Danièle Thompson and Pierre Trividic)
Étoiles d'Or (France)
Won: Best Actor – Leading Role (Charles Berling)
Won: Best Director (Patrice Chéreau)

References

External links

1990s French-language films
French LGBT-related films
Films whose director won the Best Director César Award
Films featuring a Best Supporting Actress César Award-winning performance
Films directed by Patrice Chéreau
1998 drama films
Films about fictional painters
Gay-related films
French drama films
1998 LGBT-related films
1998 films
LGBT-related drama films
1990s French films